The United States Antarctic Program (or USAP; formerly known as the United States Antarctic Research Program or USARP and the United States Antarctic Service or USAS) is an organization of the United States government which has a presence in the Antarctica continent. Founded in 1959, the USAP manages all U.S. scientific research and related logistics in Antarctica as well as aboard ships in the Southern Ocean.

United States Antarctic Program 
The United States established the U.S. Antarctic Research Program (USARP) in 1959—the name was later changed to the U.S. Antarctic Program—immediately following the success of the International Geophysical Year (IGY). Today, the National Science Foundation (NSF) has a Presidential Mandate to manage the United States Antarctic Program, through which it operates three year-round research stations and two research vessels, coordinates all U.S. science on the southernmost continent, and works with other federal agencies, the U.S. military, and civilian contractors, to provide the necessary logistical support for the science.

The U.S. is a signatory to the Antarctic Treaty and the conduct of science is the principal expression of U.S. interest in the Antarctic.

In October 1970 President Richard Nixon stated U.S. policy for Antarctica to be:[T]o maintain the Antarctic Treaty and ensure that this continent will continue to be used only for peaceful purposes and shall not become an area or object of international discord; to foster cooperative scientific research for the solution of worldwide and regional problems, including environmental monitoring and prediction and assessment of resources; and to protect the Antarctic environment and develop appropriate measures to ensure the equitable and wise use of living and non-living resources… Science has provided a successful basis for international accord, and the Antarctic is the only continent where science serves as the principal expression of national policy and interest."In 1970 and again in 1976 National Security Decision Memoranda (71 and 318) reaffirmed the "importance of maintaining an active and influential U.S. presence in the Antarctic that is 'responsive to U.S. scientific, economic, and political objectives.'"

In February 1982 President Ronald Reagan in White House Memorandum 6646 reaffirmed the prior policy and noted that the presence in Antarctica shall include "the conduct of scientific activities in major disciplines" and "year-round occupation of the South Pole and two coastal stations."

On 9 June 1994 Presidential Decision Directive NSC 26 ("United States Policy on the Arctic and Antarctic Regions") stated that U.S. policy toward Antarctica has four fundamental objectives: (1) protecting the relatively unspoiled environment of Antarctica and its associated ecosystems, (2) preserving and pursuing unique opportunities for scientific research to understand Antarctica and global physical and environmental systems, (3) maintaining Antarctica as an area of international cooperation reserved exclusively for peaceful purposes, and (4) assuring the conservation and sustainable management of the living resources in the oceans surrounding Antarctica.

An April 1996 report, U.S. Antarctic Program, by the President's National Science and Technology Council, directed the establishment of the present Panel and reaffirmed that essential elements of U.S. national and scientific interests are well served by continued involvement in scientific activity in the Antarctic as carried out by the U.S. Antarctic Program. The report states that policies in the 1982 memorandum continue to be appropriate at the current funding level and that present U.S. policy and practice with respect to the U.S. Antarctic Program are well justified.

Background

Early U.S. expeditions to Antarctica 
The first Americans to work in the Antarctic were sealers and whalers who discovered many sub-Antarctic islands. They were first to explore parts of the great peninsula jutting out of the Antarctic mainland toward South America. Among them was Nathaniel Palmer, who was among the first to see Antarctica, while on board the Hero in 1820, though historians have not settled the question of who discovered Antarctica. James Eights, a geologist from Albany, New York, became the first U.S. scientist to work in Antarctica. In 1830, aboard the Annawan, Eights made investigations in the South Shetland Islands and westward along the Antarctic Peninsula.

Expeditions sponsored by several nations approached the Antarctic continent early in the 19th century. Among the leaders was Charles Wilkes, a U.S. Navy lieutenant who commanded an expedition in 1839–40 that was the first to prove the existence of the continent.

In 1928–1930 and 1933–1935, Admiral Richard E. Byrd led two privately sponsored expeditions, one that included the first flight over the South Pole in 1929, sparking U.S. interest in Antarctica. The U.S. Antarctic Service Expedition (1939–1940), under the leadership of the U.S. Navy, maintained bases at Marguerite Bay and Bay of Whales.

Operation Highjump in 1946–1947 was the largest single expedition ever to explore Antarctica, involving 13 naval vessels, numerous airplanes and more than 4,700 men. The next year, the Navy's Operation Windmill used helicopters to complete some of the work begun during Highjump.

The International Geophysical Year and the Antarctic Treaty 
In 1956–57 the U.S. Navy, during Operation Deep Freeze I, and in conjunction with research teams funded by the National Science Foundation, established seven research stations in Antarctica to prepare for the International Geophysical Year (IGY, 1957–58). The IGY was an intensive, multi-national, multi-disciplinary, global research effort designed to study a wide range of geophysical processes. Much of that effort took place in Antarctica and was crucial in establishing Antarctica as a continent for peace and science.

The international coordination that resulted from the IGY ultimately lead to the Antarctic Treaty, which was signed in 1959. Since then, Treaty nations have agreed to several addenda, including the 1991 Environmental Protocol to the Antarctic Treaty which establishes rules and procedures specifically designed to protect the Antarctic environment. The Protocol was ratified and went into effect in 1998.

The U.S. Antarctic Program Today 
The U.S. Antarctic Program operates three year-round research stations and two research vessels. Additional temporary field camps are constructed and operated during the austral summer.

McMurdo Station 
The station sits on the eastern shore of McMurdo Sound, the southernmost body of seasonally open water in the world. On the west side of the Sound, the Royal Society Range and Mount Discovery, an extinct volcano, provide spectacular vistas.

McMurdo Sound is a historic area. In 1841, James Clark Ross brought his ships HMS Erebus and HMS Terror into the Sound, farther south than anyone had ever gone, before sailing eastward along a great wall of ice. He and his crew were the first humans to see the island and the ice shelf that both now bear his name. In 1902, Robert F. Scott wintered HMS Discovery in Winter Quarters Bay, adjacent to the station. Both of Scott's (1901–1904 and 1910–1913) and Ernest Shackleton's (1907–1909 and 1914–1916) expeditions used the area as a base to deploy sledging parties for both scientific exploration and attempts to reach the South Pole. The huts these expeditions built still stand today at Hut Point, Cape Evans, and Cape Royds.

The original station was constructed in 1955–1956. With many additions and modernizations over the years, today's station is the primary logistics facility for airborne and overland resupply of inland stations and field science projects. The station is also the waste management center for much of the USAP.

McMurdo has two airfields. McMurdo also has a heliport to support helicopter operations.

Approximately 90% of USAP participants live in or pass through McMurdo Station. The austral winter population ranges from 150 to 200, with the summer population varying between 800 and 1,000. The station has routine weekly flights to and from New Zealand during the austral summer (October – February), a period called "Mainbody," with fewer flights during the winter months (March – September).

Amundsen-Scott South Pole Station 
South Pole Station is located at the geographic South Pole, on the polar plateau, at an elevation of 2,835 m (9,300 ft) above sea level. The station sits on an ice sheet that is 2,700 m (8,858 ft) thick and drifts with the ice at about 10 m (33 ft) a year toward the Weddell Sea.

The mean annual temperature is –49 °C (–56 °F). Average monthly temperatures range from –28 °C (–18 °F) in the summer to –60 °C (–76 °F) in winter. The record high of – 12.3 °C (9.9 °F) was recorded in December 2011, and the record low of –82.8 °C (–117 °F) was recorded in June 1982. The site has very low humidity, and precipitation is only about 20 cm of snow (8 cm water equivalent) per year. Drifting is the primary cause of snow accumulation around buildings. Average wind speed is 10.8 knots.

The original station was built in 1956-1957 and is buried beneath the ice. A second station, located under a geodesic dome, was completed in 1975. The Dome was dismantled in 2009-10 and removed from the continent. The current station was dedicated on January 12, 2008. The winter population is around 45, and the summer population averages 150.

Most Antarctic Program personnel and cargo reach the South Pole from McMurdo Station via LC-130 ski-equipped aircraft, whereas most fuel IS transported via surface traverse from McMurdo Station. The short austral summer, when most activity occurs, is from late October through mid-February. The station is isolated for the rest of the year.

Research at the South Pole includes astronomy, astrophysics, aeronomy, auroral and geospace studies, meteorology, geomagnetism, seismology, earth-tide measurements, and glaciology.

Palmer Station 
Palmer Station, on the Antarctic Peninsula region, is named after Nathaniel B. Palmer, the American sailor who pioneered the exploration of the Peninsula in 1820. The station is located on Anvers Island at 64°46' S, 64°03’ W and consists of two major buildings and several small ones. There is no airfield.

Located just north of the Antarctic Circle, the climate is milder than that of the other U.S. Antarctic stations. Temperatures in the summer range from just below freezing to above 4 °C (40 °F). Winter temperatures range from 0 °C (32 °F) to -10 °C (14 °F). Palmer Station is often windy and wet, with both snow and rain. The water equivalent in snow and rain averages 81 cm (32 in) per year. Wildlife is abundant near the station, which makes it superbly located for ecosystem research.

The station population is about 44 in the summer and 20 or more in winter. Unlike the South Pole and McMurdo stations, Palmer usually receives transportation year-round and does not generally have a period of winter isolation.

Research vessels 
It can accommodate 39 scientists and ASC personnel and operates throughout the Southern Ocean.

Lawrence M. Gould has berthing space to accommodate 28 scientists and ASC personnel. There are an additional nine bunks for passengers transiting to Palmer Station. Lawrence M. Gould transports personnel and cargo to and from Palmer Station and supports research in the Antarctic Peninsula region.

Field camps 
Every season the Program establishes several dozen field camps to house researchers and support staff around the continent. These range in size from just two or three people in small pitched tents, to large camps of up to 60 people in temporary shelters, to permanent, hard-walled structures that teams return to year after year.

Science

Astrophysics and Geospace 
The Astrophysics and Geospace Sciences Program sponsors research areas that either use Antarctica as an observing platform or contribute to an understanding of the role played by the Antarctic upper atmosphere in global environmental processes.

Organisms and Ecosystems 
The Organisms and Ecosystems Program supports research at all levels of biological organization, from molecular, cellular and organismal to communities and ecosystems.

Earth Sciences 
The Earth Sciences Program provides insights into Antarctica's geologic history and lead to increased understanding of processes shaping it today.

Glaciology 
The Glaciology Program supports research concerned with the history and dynamics of the Antarctic ice sheet and its surrounding ice shelves. Studies of the processes controlling the mass balance and dynamics of the ice sheet are also important.

Ocean and Atmospheric Sciences 
The Ocean and Atmospheric Sciences Program aims to advance understanding of the physics and chemistry of both oceanic and lower atmospheric processes, and environments at high southern latitudes, and their links at local, regional and global scales across the Antarctic continent and surrounding Southern Ocean.

Artists and Writers 
The Artists and Writers Program supports participants whose work requires them to be in the Antarctic to complete their project, in particular projects that increase understanding and appreciation of the Antarctic and of human activities on the southernmost continent.

PolarTREC 
PolarTREC (Teachers and Researchers Exploring and Collaborating) is an NSF-funded program that brings teachers from the United States to the polar regions to spend three to six weeks participating in hands-on field research experiences. Managed by the Arctic Research Consortium of the United States (ARCUS), the goal is to invigorate polar science education and understanding by bringing educators and polar researchers together.

Logistics 
Antarctica is the most remote region of the world, with no native inhabitants or infrastructure and nearly no vegetation. Working in such a hostile environment requires specialized systems to keep scientists and support staff safe and equipment operational.

Airplanes 
The Antarctic Program uses a variety of aircraft to transport people and cargo to and from Antarctica, as well as throughout the continent. McMurdo Station maintains two landing strips on the adjacent McMurdo Ice Shelf: Williams Airfield for ski-equipped planes, and Phoenix Airfield for wheeled planes. U.S. Air Force C-17 cargo planes and unique New York Air National Guard ski-equipped LC-130s ferry people and cargo between Christchurch, New Zealand and McMurdo Station. During the peak of the Antarctic summer, the ice runways aren't able to support the weight of wheeled aircraft and only planes that can take off and land on skis can operate.

For transportation across vast distances around the continent, the Program uses a combination of ski-equipped LC-130s and ski-equipped Basler BT-3 and Twin Otter planes through a contract with through Kenn Borek Air, Ltd.. Ski-equipped planes can land on groomed and maintained ski runways like those at Amundsen-Scott South Pole Station and other field camps, or in relatively smooth ungroomed snow.

Helicopters 
The program maintains a small fleet of helicopters, under contract, at McMurdo Station to transport people and cargo around the immediate area of the station. Helicopters also carry scientific survey equipment and reconnoiter landing and scientific sites. Occasionally some of the helicopters will be temporarily set up at larger field camps to enable transport around an otherwise inaccessible region. The current helicopter support contract is held by Air Center Helicopters.

Traverses 
Tractor-pulled convoys or “traverses” are used to transport large quantities of fuel and cargo across large distances. Other "science traverses" transport heavy science equipment to field sites hundreds of miles from the station.

Vessels/boats 
The program maintains two research vessels, RVIB Nathaniel B. Palmer and ASRV Laurence M. Gould. The ships are used to both transport people and supplies between Palmer Station on the Antarctic Peninsula, and the port at Punta Arenas, Chile, and to embark on longer science-focused voyages to understand the Southern Ocean or visit other remote areas of the continent.

Smaller boats at Palmer Station, including inflatable rafts and larger rigid-hulled inflatable boats, are used to transport scientists around the islands near the station.

McMurdo Station is resupplied by ship at the end of every summer season. The U.S. Coast Guard heavy icebreaker Polar Star cuts a channel for a cargo ship to pass through and reach the ice pier at the station. A fuel tanker usually follows the cargo vessel to deliver fuel.

Vehicles and transport 
The Program has a fleet of vehicles to meet a range of needs at each station. A variety of large and small loaders are used to move cargo and other heavy equipment around. Tracked vehicles, including PistenBullys and Hagglunds transport people and equipment over snow and ice covered regions. Smaller snowmobiles are also used for transport across snow and ice-covered areas as well. “Ivan the Terra Bus” and the large Kress are used to transport large numbers of people to and from the airfields over the ice roads of McMurdo Station. Passenger vans with wide tires are also used to transport people around McMurdo Station and Amundsen-Scott South Pole station as well. McMurdo Station also has a small fleet of pickup trucks.

Power/water/wastewater 
Each station uses diesel fuel to generate electricity. At McMurdo Station, wind turbines installed by Antarctic New Zealand in 2010 supply about a third of the station's electricity in a cooperative agreement with ANZ. Field camps have been increasingly using solar power, taking advantage of the 24 hours of daylight during the Antarctic summer.

Reverse osmosis is used to desalinate sea water for drinking at McMurdo and Palmer stations. Potable water at Amundsen-Scott South Pole Station, which sits atop an ice sheet nearly three kilometers (two miles) thick, is produced by melting ice.

Wastewater is treated by the base wastewater plant using the activated sludge process.The effluent is sterilized using ultra violet light and discharged back into McMurdo Sound. Waste sludge is dried by being processed with a belt filter press and then boxed up for shipment back to the United States for incineration.

Food 
Each station has its own kitchen and cafeteria. Food is provided free-of-charge to program participants and official visitors. The cafeterias serve breakfast, lunch, dinners, and a midnight meal for the night shift. Each station has a range of rotating entrees. Fresh fruit and vegetables, known colloquially as “freshies,” are popular items, but because of their short shelf life are not always available.

Large field camps often have their own chef that cooks large group meals from shelf-stable supplies sent out at the beginning of their field season. At smaller field camps, cooking duties are often shared with other responsibilities amongst camp staff or researchers.

Current Developments

AIMS 
The Antarctic Infrastructure Modernization for Science (AIMS) is a ten-year construction project to upgrade and update McMurdo Station's infrastructure. Starting in 2021, the project will build about 370,000 square feet of new facilities, while razing several of the station's aging structures.

Agencies and organizations involved

National Science Foundation 
The NSF has overall management responsibility for U.S. activities in Antarctica. Organized through its Office of Polar Programs, it has responsibility for a range of day-to-day functions including preparing an annual budget and operational plans for consideration by the executive branch and for review and appropriation by Congress; obtaining advice from the scientific community, as needed, to develop scientific goals for NSF-supported research in Antarctica; evaluating and supporting proposals for research and education from U.S. universities, other research institutions, and federal agencies; detailed planning of logistics and transmitting logistics requirements, along with necessary funds, to elements of the Department of Defense and the United States Coast Guard; managing facilities, including the planning, design, engineering, construction, and maintenance of Antarctic infrastructure; developing a government support contract and managing a contractor charged with operating Antarctic stations and research vessels and providing related services, including construction; developing and implementing a comprehensive safety, environmental, and health program for U.S. activities in Antarctica; arranging cooperative scientific and logistics programs with other Antarctic Treaty nations; designating a senior U.S. representative in Antarctica and ensuring on-site management of field programs in Antarctica; and serving as a clearinghouse and source of information regarding Antarctic records, files, documents, and maps maintained within agencies and nongovernmental organizations.

Support contractors 
Leidos is currently the prime contractor supporting the USAP. Leidos manages a team that includes partner companies performing specific support functions. Together, the companies comprising the support contractor are known collectively as the Antarctic Support Contract (ASC).

Department of Defense 
The DoD provides logistical support to the Program, including airlift between Christchurch, New Zealand and McMurdo Station, continental transport aboard ski-equipped C-130s, weather forecasting, air traffic control and shipborne fuel and cargo delivery support.

NASA 
NSF partners with NASA to conduct a range of scientific research in Antarctica, with the NSF-managed Antarctic Program providing the logistical support for this scientific work. It maintains a long-duration balloon facility at McMurdo Station to launch scientific payloads into the stratosphere suspended from large helium balloons. In addition, the McMurdo ground station downloads data from about a dozen polar orbiting satellites.

NOAA 
NOAA maintains a facility at the South Pole that monitors the hole in the ozone layer and maintains long-term records of the relative balance of gases in the atmosphere. One of the longest and most complete record of gasses such as carbon-dioxide in the atmosphere comes from the South Pole. They also partner with the NSF for transportation to and from their penguin research facility in the South Shetland Islands.

Department of Homeland Security 
The United States Coast Guard's heavy icebreaker Polar Star breaks a channel from the sea ice edge to McMurdo Station every year and escorts the annual fuel and resupply ships.

Department of the Interior 
The Department of the Interior's Aviation Management Division provides procurement assistance, contract administration, and inspection for commercial aircraft providers contracted to the USAP. The U.S. Geological Survey holds geodetic data that support mapping in Antarctica and administers Antarctic place-name decisions.

Department of State 
The Department of State is responsible for formulating foreign policy and providing foreign policy direction in regard to developing and implementing an integrated U.S. policy for Antarctica. This includes conducting foreign relations regarding Antarctica and adjudicating legal matters related to interpreting and implementing the Antarctic Treaty.

Department of Justice 
The Department of Justice's U.S. Marshals Service became the official law enforcement entity for the South Pole through an agreement with the National Science Foundation (NSF) and the U.S. Attorney for Hawaii. In 1989, the NSF approached the marshal for the District of Hawaii to assist in setting up a legal presence in Antarctica. The NSF sent two station managers from Antarctica to Glynco for training, and the Service appointed them as special deputies. The official swearing-in took place in Hawaii, the headquarters district for the American stations at the South Pole. The two special deputies rotate duty every other year. Special Deputy U.S. Marshals greet all visitors to McMurdo Station, Antarctica, with a lecture and warns that serious crimes committed on the continent by Americans can be prosecuted in the United States.

References

External links 

 National Science Foundation, Office of Polar Programs
 The Antarctic Sun
 USAP Photo Library
 Future USAP
 United States Antarctic Projects Office-Official Observer Reports (1957-1964) at Dartmouth College Library

 
Antarctic agencies
1959 establishments in the United States